Cynara is a genus of perennial plants.

Cynara may also refer to:

 A woman in Ernest Dowson's poem Non Sum Qualis eram Bonae Sub Regno Cynarae, first published in 1894
 Cynara (Delius), a musical setting by Frederick Delius of the poem
 Cynara (play), a 1930s London and Broadway production written by H. M. Harwood and Robert Gore-Browne
 Cynara (film), a 1932 movie based on the play and starring Ronald Colman
 "Cynara", a song by the industrial band Clan of Xymox
 Cynara Coomer, South African surgeon and medical journalist

See also
 Senara (disambiguation)
 Sinara (disambiguation)
 Synara San, a character in the animated television series Star Wars Resistance